Richard Charles may refer to:

Sir Richard Charles, 1st Baronet
Dick Charles
Ricky Charles

See also

Charles (surname)